Judith Gould is a fictional American writer of romance novels, and is the pseudonym used by co-authors: Nicholas Peter "Nick" Bienes and Rhea Gallaher, who are actually both men. Gould is a New York Times bestselling author whose books have been translated into 22 languages.

In addition to being writing partners, Bienes and Gallaher are also involved romantically. They currently live together in room 600 of the famous Hotel Chelsea in New York City, regarded as the hotel's most luxurious suite.

Biographies

Nicholas Peter Bienes
Nick Bienes was born on January 9, 1952, in a small town in Austria, and baptized Klaus Peter Peer. After his biological father died he was adopted by his aunt, who had married a U.S. American serviceman, and consequently he was renamed Klaus Peter Bienes. He has lived in Austria, Yugoslavia, Germany and the United States. He is a native speaker of both German and English.

Rhea Gallaher
(pronounced Ray)
Rhea Gallager was born on May 22, 1945. He grew up in Harriman, Tennessee (a small town near Knoxville, Tennessee).

Bibliography as Judith Gould

Single novels
Sins,	1982/Nov (adapted into the 1986 miniseries Sins, starring Joan Collins)
Dazzle,	1989/May
Never Too Rich,	1990/Oct
Forever,	1992/Jun
Too Damn Rich,	1993/Jun
Till The End Of Time,	1998/Dec
Rhapsody,	1999/Nov
Time To Say Goodbye,	2000/Aug
A Moment In Time,	2001/Aug
The Best Is Yet To Come,	2002/Aug
The Greek Villa,	2003/Oct
The Parisian Affair,	2004/Oct
Dreamboat,	2005/Oct
The Secret Heiress,	2006/Oct
Greek Winds of Fury,	2008/Dec

Love-makers Trilogy
The Love-Makers,	1985
The Texas Years,	1989/Jan
Second Love,	1997/Nov

References and sources

External links
Official Site
List of books
NAL biography

20th-century American novelists
21st-century American novelists
American romantic fiction writers
Living people
Year of birth missing (living people)